South Indian Basin is an undersea basin name approved 7/63 (ACUF 12).

It lies between Antarctica and the Southeast Indian Ridge.

References

Oceanic basins of the Southern Ocean